RJR Nabisco, Inc. v. European Community, 579 U.S. ___ (2016), was a United States Supreme Court case in which the Court held that the Racketeer Influenced and Corrupt Organizations Act has certain extraterritorial applications, but that plaintiffs must prove injuries within the United States for the Act to apply. The decision received criticism in the Harvard Law Review for potentially restricting access to American courts for litigants from outside the country.

The case was brought by the European Union's member states. RJR Nabisco (and several subsidiary organizations) were accused of engaging in cigarette smuggling and tax evasion.

See also
 List of United States Supreme Court cases
 List of United States Supreme Court cases, volume 579
 List of United States Supreme Court cases by the Roberts Court

References

External links
 

United States Supreme Court cases
United States Supreme Court cases of the Roberts Court
2016 in United States case law
United States tobacco case law
R. J. Reynolds Tobacco Company
Racketeer Influenced and Corrupt Organizations Act
European Union law
United States–European Union relations
United States federal jurisdiction case law